Warren Hastings  (6 December 1732 – 22 August 1818) was a British colonial administrator, who served as the first Governor of the Presidency of Fort William (Bengal), the head of the Supreme Council of Bengal, and so the first Governor-General of Bengal in 1772–1785. He and Robert Clive are credited with laying the foundation of the British Empire in India. He was an energetic organizer and reformer. In 1779–1784 he led forces of the East India Company against a coalition of native states and the French. Finally, the well-organized British side held its own, while France lost influence in India. In 1787, he was accused of corruption and impeached, but after a long trial acquitted in 1795. He was made a Privy Councillor in 1814.

Early life
Hastings was born in Churchill, Oxfordshire, in 1732 to a poor gentleman father, Penystoe Hastings, and a mother, Hester Hastings, who died soon after he was born. Despite Penystone Hastings's lack of wealth, the family had been lords of the manor and patrons of the living of Daylesford in direct line from 1281 until 1715. It was relinquished after there had been a considerable loss of family wealth due to support given to Charles I. Young Warren was brought up by his grandfather and educated in a charity school with the poorest children in the Gloucestershire village of Daylesford. At some point he was rescued by an uncle who sent him to London.

Warren Hastings attended Westminster School, where he coincided with the future Prime Ministers Lord Shelburne and the Duke of Portland and with the poet William Cowper. He quickly excelled as a top scholar but was forced to leave at sixteen, when his uncle died. He joined the British East India Company in 1750 as a clerk (writer) and sailed out to India, reaching Calcutta in August 1750. There he built up a reputation for diligence and spent his free time learning about India and mastering Urdu and Persian. His work won him promotion in 1752 when he was sent to Kasimbazar, a major trading post in Bengal, where he worked for William Watts. While there he gained further experience in the politics of East India.

British traders still relied on the whims of local rulers, so that the political turmoil in Bengal was unsettling. The elderly moderate Nawab Alivardi Khan was likely to be succeeded by his grandson Siraj ud-Daulah, but there were several other claimants. This made British trading posts throughout Bengal increasingly insecure, as Siraj ud-Daulah was known to harbour anti-European views and be likely to launch an attack once he took power. When Alivardi Khan died in April 1756, the British traders and a small garrison at Kasimbazar were left vulnerable. On 3 June, after being surrounded by a much larger force, the British were persuaded to surrender to prevent a massacre. Hastings was imprisoned with others in the Bengali capital, Murshidabad, while the Nawab's forces marched on Calcutta and captured it. The garrison and civilians were then locked up under appalling conditions in the Black Hole of Calcutta.

 
For a while Hastings remained in Murshidabad and was even used by the Nawab as an intermediary, but fearing for his life, he escaped to the island of Fulta, where a number of refugees from Calcutta had taken shelter. While there, he met and married Mary Buchanan, the widow of one of the victims of the Black Hole. Shortly afterwards a British expedition from Madras under Robert Clive arrived to rescue them. Hastings served as a volunteer in Clive's forces as they retook Calcutta in January 1757. After this swift defeat, the Nawab urgently sought peace and the war came to an end. Clive was impressed with Hastings when he met him, and arranged for his return to Kasimbazar to resume his pre-war activities. Later in 1757 fighting resumed, leading to the Battle of Plassey, where Clive won a decisive victory over the Nawab. Siraj ud-Daulah was overthrown and replaced by his commander-in-chief Mir Jafar, who initiated policies favourable to the East India Company traders, before falling out with them and being overthrown.

Rising status
In 1758 Hastings became the British Resident in the Bengali capital of Murshidabad – a major step forward in his career – at the instigation of Clive. His role in the city was ostensibly that of an ambassador but as Bengal came increasingly under the dominance of the East India Company he was often given the task of issuing orders to the new Nawab on behalf of Clive and the Calcutta authorities. Hastings personally sympathised with Mir Jafar and regarded many of the demands placed on him by the company as excessive. Hastings had already developed a philosophy that was grounded in trying to establish a more understanding relationship with India's inhabitants and their rulers, and he often tried to mediate between the two sides.

During Mir Jafar's reign the East India Company exerted an increasingly large role in the running of the region, and effectively took over the defence of Bengal against external invaders when Bengal's troops proved insufficient for the task. As he grew older, Mir Jafar became gradually less effective in ruling the state, and in 1760 EIC troops ousted him from power and replaced him with Mir Qasim. Hastings expressed his doubts to Calcutta over the move, believing they were honour-bound to support Mir Jafar, but his opinions were overruled. Hastings established a good relationship with the new Nawab and again had misgivings about the demands he relayed from his superiors. In 1761 he was recalled and appointed to the Calcutta council.

Conquest of Bengal

Hastings was personally angered when investigating trading abuses in Bengal. He alleged that some European and British-allied Indian merchants were taking advantage of the situation to enrich themselves personally. Persons travelling under the unauthorised protection of the British flag engaged in widespread fraud and illegal trading, knowing that local customs officials would be cowed into not interfering with them. Hastings felt this was bringing shame on Britain's reputation and urged the authorities in Calcutta to put an end to it. The Council considered his report but ultimately rejected Hastings' proposals. He was fiercely criticised by other members, many of whom had themselves profited from the trade.

Ultimately, little was done to stem the abuses, and Hastings began to consider quitting his post and returning to Britain. His resignation was only delayed by the outbreak of fresh fighting in Bengal. Once on the throne Qasim proved increasingly independent in his actions, and he rebuilt Bengal's army by hiring European instructors and mercenaries who greatly improved the standard of his forces. He felt gradually more confident and in 1764 when a dispute broke out in the settlement of Patna he captured its British garrison and threatened to execute them if the East India Company responded militarily. When Calcutta dispatched troops anyway, Mir Qasim executed the hostages. British forces then went on the attack and won a series of battles culminating in the decisive Battle of Buxar in October 1764. After this Mir Qasim fled into exile in Delhi, where he died in 1777. The Treaty of Allahabad (1765) gave the East India Company the right to collect taxes in Bengal on behalf of the Mughal Emperor.

Hastings resigned in December 1764 and sailed for Britain the following month. He left deeply saddened by the failure of the more moderate strategy that he had supported, but which had been rejected by the hawkish members of the Calcutta Council. Once he arrived in London Hastings began spending far beyond his means. He stayed in fashionable addresses and had his picture painted by Joshua Reynolds in spite of the fact that, unlike many of his contemporaries, he had not amassed a fortune while in India. Eventually, having run up enormous debts, Hastings realised he needed to return to India to restore his finances, and applied to the East India Company for employment. His application was initially rejected as he had made many political enemies, including the powerful director Laurence Sulivan. Eventually an appeal to Sulivan's rival Robert Clive secured Hastings the position of deputy ruler at the city of Madras. He sailed from Dover in March 1769. On the voyage he met the German Baroness Marian von Imhoff (1749–1837) and her husband. He fell in love with the Baroness and they began an affair, seemingly with her husband's consent. Hastings' first wife, Mary, had died in 1759, and he planned to marry the Baroness once she had obtained a divorce from her husband. The process took a long time and it was not until 1777 when news of divorce came from Germany that Hastings was finally able to marry her.

Madras and Calcutta
Hastings arrived in Madras shortly after the First Anglo-Mysore War of 1767–1769, when the forces of Hyder Ali had threatened the capture of the city. The Treaty of Madras (4 April 1769) ended the war but failed to settle the dispute and three further Anglo-Mysore Wars followed (1780–1799). During his time at Madras Hastings initiated reforms of trading practices which cut out the use of middlemen and benefited both the Company and the Indian labourers, but otherwise the period was relatively uneventful for him.

By this stage Hastings shared Clive's view that the three major British Presidencies (settlements) – Madras, Bombay and Calcutta – should be brought under single rule rather than being governed separately as they currently were. In 1772 he was appointed to be Governor of Calcutta, the most important of the Presidencies. In Britain moves were underway to reform the divided system of government and establish single rule across all of British-controlled regions in India with its capital in Kolkata (Calcutta). Hastings became the first Governor General in 1773.

While Governor, Hastings launched a major crackdown on bandits operating in Bengal, which proved largely successful. He also faced the severe Bengal Famine, which resulted in between two and ten million deaths.

Governor-General

The Regulating Act of 1773 brought the presidencies of Madras and Bombay under Bengal's control. It raised Hastings from Governor to the new post of Governor-General, but limited his power by making the Governor-General one member of a five-man Supreme Council. This was so confusingly structured that it was difficult to tell what constitutional position Hastings actually held.

According to William Dalrymple:
He got quickly to work, beginning the process of turning the EIC into an administrative service. Hastings first major change was to move all of all the functions of government from Murshidabad to Calcutta.... Throughout 1773, Hastings worked with extraordinary energy. He unified currency systems, ordered the codification of Hindu laws and digests of Muslim law books, reformed the tax and customs system, fixed land revenue and stopped the worst oppression being carried out on behalf of private traders by the local agents. He created an efficient postal service, backed a proper cartographic survey of India by James Rennell and built a series of public granaries, including the great Gola at Patna, to make sure the famine of 1770-71 was never repeated.... Underlying all Hastings' work was a deep respect for the land he had lived in since his teens.... Hastings genuinely liked India, and by the time he became Governor spoke not only good Bengali and Urdu but also fluent court and literary Persian.

War with France
In 1777 during the American War of Independence (1775–1783), the Americans had captured a British field army at the Battle of Saratoga during the Saratoga campaign. This emboldened the French to sign a military alliance with the new United States of America, and declare war on Great Britain. The French concentrated in the Caribbean islands, and on India. Meanwhile, the presidencies of Madras and Bombay became involved in serious quarrels with the greatest of the native states. Madras with the formidable Hyder Ali of Mysore and with the Nizam of Hyderabad, and Bombay with the Marathas. France sent a fleet under Admiral Pierre André de Suffren. The combination meant Hastings faced a formidable challenge, with only Oudh as an ally.<ref>Penderel Moon, Warren Hastings and British India'; (1947) pp 201–243.</ref> In six years of intense and confused fighting, 1779–1784. Hastings sent one army marching across India to help Bombay, and another to Madras. His greatest achievement was in breaking up the hostile coalition. By 1782 he made peace with the Marathas. The French fleet had been repeatedly delayed. Suffren finally arrived in 1782 to discover that the Indian coalition had fallen apart, that Hastings had captured all the French ports, and Suffren could achieve nothing. When the wars ended in 1784, British rule in India had not changed, but the French position was now much weaker. The East India Company now had an efficient system in operation. However, Hastings's multiple wartime operations needed large sums of money and London sent nothing. His methods of using the local treasuries later became the main line of attack in the impeachment brought against him.Henry Dodwell, "Warren Hastings and the Assignment of the Carnatic." English Historical Review 40.159, 1925, pp. 375–396 online.

Bhutan and Tibet
In 1773, Hastings responded to an appeal for help from the Raja of the princely state of Cooch Behar to the north of Bengal, whose territory had been invaded by Zhidar, the Druk Desi of Bhutan the previous year. Hastings agreed to help on the condition that Cooch Behar recognise British sovereignty. The Raja agreed and with the help of British troops they pushed the Bhutanese out of the Duars and into the foothills in 1773.

The Druk Desi returned to face civil war at home. His opponent Jigme Senge, the regent for the seven-year-old Shabdrung (the Bhutanese equivalent of the Dalai Lama), had supported popular discontent. Zhidar was unpopular for his corvee tax (he sought unreasonably to rebuild a major dzong in one year), as well as for his overtures to the Manchu Emperors which threatened Bhutanese independence. Zhidar was soon overthrown and forced to flee to Tibet, where he was imprisoned and a new Druk Desi, Kunga Rinchen, installed in his place. Meanwhile, the Sixth Panchen Lama, who had imprisoned Zhidar, interceded on behalf of the Bhutanese with a letter to Hastings, imploring him to cease hostilities in return for friendship. Hastings saw the opportunity to establish relations with both the Tibetans and the Bhutanese and wrote a letter to the Panchen Lama proposing "a general treaty of amity and commerce between Tibet and Bengal".

In February 1782, news reached the headquarters of the EIC in Calcutta of the reincarnation of the Panchen Lama. Hastings proposed sending a mission to Tibet with a message of congratulation, designed to strengthen amicable relations established by Bogle on his earlier visit. With the assent of the EIC Court of Directors, Samuel Turner was appointed chief of the Tibet mission on 9 January 1783 with fellow EIC employee Samuel Davis as "Draftsman & Surveyor". Turner returned to the Governor-General's camp at Patna in 1784 where he reported he had been unable to visit the Tibetan capital at Lhasa, but received a promise that merchants sent there from India would be encouraged.

Turner was instructed to obtain a pair of yaks on his travels, which he duly did. They were transported to Hasting's menagerie in Calcutta and on the Governor-General's return to England, the yaks went too, although only the male survived the difficult sea voyage. Noted artist George Stubbs subsequently painted the animal's portrait as The Yak of Tartary and in 1854 it went on to appear, albeit stuffed, at The Great Exhibition at Crystal Palace in London.

Hasting's return to England ended any further efforts to engage in diplomacy with Tibet.

Impeachment

In 1785, after 10 years of service, during which he helped extend and regularise the nascent Raj created by Clive of India, Hastings resigned. He was replaced by the Earl Cornwallis; Cornwallis served as Commander-in-Chief of British India and Governor of the Presidency of Fort William, also known as the Bengal Presidency.

On return to England, Hastings was impeached in the House of Commons for alleged crimes in India, notably embezzlement, extortion and coercion, and an alleged judicial killing of Maharaja Nandakumar. At first thought unlikely to succeed, the prosecution was managed by MPs including Edmund Burke, encouraged by Sir Philip Francis, whom Hastings had wounded during a duel in India, Charles James Fox and Richard Brinsley Sheridan. When the charges of the indictment were read, the 20 counts took Edmund Burke two full days to read. According to historian Mithi Mukherjee, the trial instituted debate between two radically opposed visions of empire – one based on ideas of power and conquest in pursuit of the exclusive national interests of the colonizer, and one represented by Burke, of sovereignty based on a recognition of the rights of the colonized.

The House sat for 148 days over a period of seven years during the investigation. The investigation was pursued at great cost to Hastings personally: he complained constantly that the cost of defending himself from the prosecution was bankrupting him. He is rumoured once to have said that the punishment would have been less extreme had he pleaded guilty. The House of Lords acquitted him of all charges on 24 April 1795. The Company subsequently compensated him with £4,000 annually, retroactive to the date he returned to England, but did not reimburse his legal fees, which he claimed to have been £70,000. He collected the stipend for nearly 29 years. Throughout the years of the trial, Hastings lived in considerable style at his leased town house, Somerset House, Park Lane. He subsequently sold the lease at auction for £9,450.

Among many who supported him in print was the pamphleteer Ralph Broome. Others disturbed by the perceived injustice of the proceedings included Frances Burney.

Letters and journals of Jane Austen and her family, who knew Hastings, show they followed the trial closely.

Later life
Hastings's supporters from the Edinburgh East India Club and a number of other gentlemen from India, gave a reportedly "elegant entertainment" for Hastings when he visited Edinburgh. A toast on the occasion went to the "Prosperity to our settlements in India" and wished that "the virtue and talents which preserved them be ever remembered with gratitude."

In 1788 Hastings bought for £54,000 an estate at Daylesford, Gloucestershire, including the site of the Hastings family's medieval seat. Thereafter he remodelled the house to designs by Samuel Pepys Cockerell with classical and Indian decoration and gardens landscaped by John Davenport. He rebuilt the Norman church in 1816, where he was buried two years later. In 1801 he was elected a Fellow of the Royal Society.

In spite of substantial compensation from the East India Company, Hastings was technically insolvent on his death.

Administrative ethos and legacy

In the last quarter of the 18th century, many senior administrators realised that to govern Indian society it was essential to learn its various religious, social, and legal customs and precedents. The importance of such knowledge to the colonial government was in Hastings's mind when he remarked in 1784, in his introduction to the English translation of the "Bhagavad Geeta" by Wilkins:

Under Hastings's term as governor-general, much administrative precedent set profoundly shaped later attitudes towards the government of British India. Hastings had great respect for the ancient scripture of Hinduism and set the British position on governance as one of looking back to the earliest precedents possible. This allowed Brahmin advisors to mould the law, as no Briton thoroughly understood Sanskrit until Sir William Jones, and even then, a literal translation was of little use – it needed to be elucidated by religious commentators well-versed in the lore and its application. This approach accentuated the Hindu caste system and to an extent the frameworks of other religions, which had at least in recent centuries been somewhat more flexibly applied. So British influence on the fluid social structure of India can largely be seen as a solidification of the privileges of the Hindu caste system through the influence of exclusively high-caste Hindu scholars advising the British on their laws. In short, under Hastings there was a codification of Hindu laws, and a digest of Muslim law books. Where British translators or interpreters read in the Artha Shastra a caste system in India, the actual wording speaks of varna and jati: skin-colour and birth, i.e. clan, and it speaks of the four societal classes, not castes: from upper-class Brahmin to lower-class Shudra.

In 1781, Hastings founded Madrasa 'Aliya at Calcutta (transformed in 2007 into Aliah University by the Government of West Bengal). In 1784, he supported the foundation of the Bengal Asiatic Society, now the Asiatic Society of Bengal, by the oriental scholar Sir William Jones. This became a storehouse for information on the subcontinent and has remained in various institutional guises to the present day. Hastings's legacy as an administrator has been somewhat dualistic: he was able to institute reforms during the time he spent as governor that would change the path India followed in subsequent years, but he retained the distinction of being also the "architect of British India and the one ruler of British India to whom the creation of such an entity was anathema."

Legacy
The city of Hastings, and the Melbourne outer suburb of Hastings, Victoria, Australia, were named after him. There is also a road and the neighbourhood of Hastings, Kolkata, in India named after him.

"Hastings" is the name of one of the four school houses in La Martiniere Calcutta (Kolkata). It is represented by the colour red. "Hastings" is also the name of one of the four school houses in Bishop Westcott Girls' School, Ranchi, again represented by the colour red. "Hastings" is a senior wing house at St Paul's School, Darjeeling, India, where all the senior wing houses are named after Anglo-Indian colonial figures.

RIMS Warren Hastings was a Royal Indian Marine troopship built by the Barrow Shipbuilding Co. and launched on 18 April 1893. The ship struck a rock and was wrecked off the coast of Réunion on the night of 14 January 1897.

Literature
Hastings took an interest in seeing the Bhagavad Gita turned into English. His efforts led to a first translation by Charles Wilkins appearing in 1785. He wrote the introduction to it which appeared on 4 October 1784 in Benares.

"Warren Hastings and His Bull", a short story by the Indian writer Uday Prakash, was adapted for stage under the same title by the director Arvind Gaur. It presents Hastings's interaction with traditional India in a work of socio-economic political satire.

A short story by the Hindi author Shivprasad Singh 'Rudra' Kashikeya called Bahti Ganga features Chait Singh, then Raja of Banaras, in conflict with Hastings, who is imprisoned by the Raja, but escapes, though ordinary people of the city make fun of him.

The Hastings career is much discussed in the historical mystery novel, Secrets in the Stones, by Tessa Harris.

Hastings is named in Book 5 of George Eliot's novel Middlemarch, where his greed for Daylesford is compared to the character Joshua Rigg's greed for money.

Hastings was rumoured to be the biological father of Eliza de Feuillide, the daughter of Philadelphia Austen Hancock and a cousin of Jane Austen. Some scholars have seen parallels between Hastings and Colonel Brandon in Austen's Sense and Sensibility: both left for India at age 17; both may have had illegitimate daughters named Eliza; both participated in a duel. Linda Robinson Walker argues that Hastings "haunts Sense and Sensibility in the character of Colonel Brandon."

See also
Company rule in India
Mughal Empire
Shah Alam II

References

Bibliography
William Dalrymple, The Anarchy: The East India Company, Corporate Violence, and the Pillage of an Empire (2019) excerpt
Alfred Mervyn Davies, Strange destiny: a biography of Warren Hastings (1935)
Suresh Chandra Ghosh, The Social Condition of the British Community in Bengal: 1757–1800 (Brill, 1970)
Keith Feiling, Warren Hastings (1954)
Philip Lawson, The East India Company: A History (Routledge, 2014)
P. J. Marshall, The impeachment of Warren Hastings (1965)
P. J. Marshall, "Hastings, Warren (1732–1818)", Oxford Dictionary of National Biography (Oxford University Press, 2004); online edn, Oct 2008 accessed 11 Nov 2014
Penderel Moon, Warren Hastings and British India (Macmillan, 1949) online
Patrick Turnbull, Warren Hastings. (New English Library, 1975)

Primary sources
G. W. Forrest, ed., Selections from the State Papers of the Governors-General of India: Warren Hastings'' (2 vols.), Blackwell's, Oxford (1910)

External links
"Warren Hastings" an essay by Thomas Babington Macaulay (October 1841)
 (within Critical and Historical Essays (Macaulay))

1732 births
1818 deaths
Governors-General of India
British East India Company people
Founders of Indian schools and colleges
Members of the Privy Council of the United Kingdom
Impeached British officials
Fellows of the Royal Society
English duellists
People educated at Westminster School, London
People from Cotswold District
People from West Oxfordshire District